Hodoșa ( or colloquially Hodos,) is a commune in Mureș County, Transylvania, Romania composed of four villages:
Hodoșa
Ihod / Ehed
Isla / Iszló
Sâmbriaș / Jobbágytelke

It formed part of the Székely Land region of the historical Transylvania province. Until 1918, the village belonged to the Maros-Torda County of the Kingdom of Hungary. After the Treaty of Trianon of 1920, it became part of Romania.

Demographics

The commune has an absolute Székely Hungarian majority. According to the 2002 census, it has a population of 1,420 of which 91.06% or 1,293 are Hungarian.

See also 
 List of Hungarian exonyms (Mureș County)

References

Communes in Mureș County
Localities in Transylvania